Kwesachu Mixtape Vol.1 is the first collaboratively produced mixtape album by producers/songwriters Micachu and Kwes and the second mixtape album by musician Micachu. Together, the producers are known as Kwesachu.

Details
Kwesachu Mixtape Vol.1 features reworks of musicians including Hot Chip, Cibelle, Metronomy, Golden Silvers, The Invisible, Man Like Me, Finn Peters, and guests upcoming artists associated with the two musicians, including MCs Ghostpoet and DELS, Romy of The xx, Brotha May, Elan Tamara and Micachu's band The Shapes.

Launch Party
A launch party was held at the Cable club in London on 5 June 2009, featuring a live Kwesachu performance which included Micachu, Kwes, Dels and Ghostpoet.

Releases
The mixtape was digitally released via their internet websites on 5 June 2009 in MP3 format. Kwesachu Vol.1 has also been pressed onto an unknown limited number of tape cassettes, available for purchase from the Rough Trade – East Shop in Brick Lane, London. All the songs are contained as one track which lasts 51 minutes and 20 seconds.

Second Mixtape
In April 2012, the duo released their second collaborative mixtape, Kwesachu Mixtape Vol.2, which features returning collaborators DELS and Ghostpoet, amongst many others. To mark its release, the duo performed a live music show with many of their collaborators on 28 April 2012, at The Southbank Centre in London, UK.

Track listing

Personnel
Tracks 3, 5, 7, 10, 12, 15 and 16 – produced by Micachu
Tracks 2, 6, 8, 11, 13, 17 and 18 – produced by Kwes
Tracks 9 & 13 – produced by Micachu & The Shapes
Tracks 4 & 15 – produced by Kwesachu (Kwes & Micachu)

References

External links
 Mixtape available for download only through Bokkle Records
 Kwes. on Warp's website
 Micachu on Rough Trade's website

2009 mixtape albums
Micachu albums
Albums produced by Kwes